The 2021 NISA Nation season has been the first season of NISA Nation. It was the inaugural season for the National Independent Soccer Association 4th tier league.

The season has been made by 10 founder teams divided in two regions and the two toppers of the two regions have been crowned champions of their own regions.

History

Northeast Division 
The season was played from September 18 to December 12. The Northeast Division ended on December 13, 2021, with a showdown between New Jersey Alliance FC and New Amsterdam FC II. It ended in a 4–0 score in favor of NJAFC.

The inaugural fall season for the Northeast  had 28 games, 116 goals scored, 4.14 goals per match, and 210 players registered during its play.

Southwest Division 
The season was played from October 30 to January 23. The southwest Division champion was discovered on January 15, 2021, with a final showdown between FC Golden State Force and Las Vegas Legends. It ended in a 4–3 score in favor of FCGSF.

The inaugural fall season for the Southwest had 12 games, 56 goals scored, 4.66 goals per match, and 151 players registered during its play.

Teams

Northeast Region

Southwest Region

Location map

Competition format
The inaugural regions were the Northeast and Southwest. In each region, the team with the most points at the end of the season is the champion. There are no playoffs or national championship.

 Northeast Region: Clubs play each other twice for a total of 10 matches.
 Southwest Region: Clubs play each other twice for a total of 6 matches.

Standings

Northeast Region

(*)

Southwest Region

Golden Boot winner 
Northeast Region Golden boot recipient Henry Martinez of New Amsterdam II. 7 goals scored.

Southwest Region Golden boot recipient Samuel Goni of FC Golden State Force. 9 goals scored.

See also
 NISA Nation
 National Independent Soccer Association
 2021 National Independent Soccer Association season

References 

National Independent Soccer Association